Vincent Gamache (born November 18, 1961) is a former American football punter. He played for the Seattle Seahawks in 1986 and for the Los Angeles Raiders in 1987.

References

1961 births
Living people
American football punters
Cal State Fullerton Titans football players
Seattle Seahawks players
Los Angeles Raiders players
National Football League replacement players